Michał Jakóbowski (born 8 September 1992 in Radziejów) is a Polish professional footballer who plays as a left winger for Chojniczanka Chojnice.

References

External links
 
 

1992 births
Living people
Polish footballers
Association football midfielders
Ekstraklasa players
I liga players
III liga players
Lech Poznań II players
Lech Poznań players
Bytovia Bytów players
Chojniczanka Chojnice players
Warta Poznań players
People from Radziejów County
Sportspeople from Kuyavian-Pomeranian Voivodeship